Arvibacter is a Gram-negative, aerobic, rod-shaped and motile genus of bacteria from the family of Chitinophagaceae with one known species (Arvibacter flaviflagrans). Arvibacter flaviflagrans has been isolated from forest soil from the Kyonggi University in Korea.

References

Chitinophagia
Bacteria genera
Monotypic bacteria genera
Taxa described in 2016